The 1929 Capital Football season was the fourth Capital Football season. There was only one ACT competition played which was the FCTSA League and was won by Queanbeyan by a 2-point margin.

1928 FCTSA League

The 1929 FCTSA League was the fourth season of the FCTSA League, the former top soccer league in the Capital Football. The league was planned to begin on 11 May as some teams withdrew from the competition and the league was not played.

Teams
 Acton
 Kingston
 Queanbeyan
 Thistles

League table

Results

1929 Canberra Cup

The 1929 FCTSA Cup was the first edition of the Canberra Cup. This was played after the ACT had cancelled the FCTSA League in replace of the Canberra Cup. Queanbeyan won the Final 3–2 against Canberra Rovers.

First round

Second round

Third round

Fourth round

Final

References

External links
 Official Website

1929 in Australian soccer
Soccer in the Australian Capital Territory